Ponteils-et-Brésis is a commune in the Gard department in southern France.

Population

Monuments
 Château de Brésis, ruined 12th century castle

See also
Communes of the Gard department

References

Communes of Gard